A navigator is an individual responsible for guiding a vehicle to its destination.

Navigator may also refer to:

Technology 
 Netscape Navigator, a web browser
 Packard Bell Navigator, an alternative shell for Windows 3.1 and Windows 95
 DOS Navigator, a free file manager for DOS and Windows
 TomTom Navigator software
 Navigator Program, a long-term NASA project
 Etak Navigator, precursor of GPS-based automotive navigation systems produced by Etak, Inc.
 Nokia 6110 Navigator, a mobile phone
 Nokia 6210 Navigator, a mobile phone
 Nokia 6710 Navigator, a mobile phone

Vehicles 
 Lincoln Navigator, a luxury sport utility vehicle
 Norton Navigator, a motorcycle made from 1960 to 1965
 USS Navigator, two US Navy tugs
 Newbridge Navigator, a type of sailing dinghy
 UC-45J Navigator, a version of the Beechcraft Model 18 aircraft

Places 
 Navigator Peak, Ellsworth Land, Antarctica
 Navigator Nunatak, a large nunatak in Aviator Glacier, Victoria Land, Antarctica
 Navigators, a rural district near Ballarat, Australia
 Navigator Islands, early European name for the Samoan Islands

Music 
 Navigator Records, a record label
 Navigators (Norwegian band), a pop band
 Navigators (Swedish band), a hip hop band
 Navigator (Che Fu album), 2002
 Navigator (Forma Tadre album)
 Navigator (Funker Vogt album), 2005
 Navigator an album by José Padilla (DJ)
 The Navigator (Andrew Cyrille album), 1982
 The Navigator (Hurray for the Riff Raff album), 2017
 The Navigator (Paul McCandless album), 1992
 The Navigator (opera), a 2008 opera by Liza Lim
 "Navigator", a song from the 1985 album Rum Sodomy & the Lash by The Pogues
 "Navigator", a 2020 song by SixTones
 ESP Navigator, a brand of ESP guitars

Films 
 The Navigator (1924 film), a comedy directed by and starring Buster Keaton
 Flight of the Navigator, a.k.a. The Navigator, a 1986 Disney science fiction film
 The Navigator: A Medieval Odyssey, a 1988 New Zealand science fiction movie
 The Navigators (film) a 2001 film by Ken Loach

Books 
 The Navigator (Pocalyko novel) (2013), by Michael Pocalyko
 The Navigator (Cussler novel) (2007), by Clive Cussler and Paul Kemprecos
 The Navigator (McNamee novel), by Eoin McNamee
 Navigator (novel) (2007), a novel by Stephen Baxter
 The Navigator (Cramer book), by Zadok Cramer, a guide for settlers moving west through the United States

Sports teams 
 Muskogee Navigators were a Western Association baseball team based in Muskogee, Oklahoma, that played from 1909 to 1910
 Navigators (cycling team), a cycling team in the United States
 North Peace Navigators, a Junior "B" ice hockey team based in Peace River, Alberta, Canada
 North Shore Navigators, a collegiate summer baseball team based in Lynn, Massachusetts
 Norwich Navigators, former name of Double A minor league baseball team Connecticut Defenders
 Tacoma Navigators, an American Basketball Association franchise
 Waco Navigators, a Texas League baseball team based in Waco, Texas, that played from 1906 to 1919

Other uses 
 The Navigators (organization), a Christian organization
 Navigator Paper, an office paper brand, made by The Navigator Company (formerly known as Portucel Soporcel Group) 
 Navigators USA, a non-aligned scouting organization founded in 2003
 Navigator Ltd, a Canadian public relations and polling company
 Guild Navigator, a type of mutated human in Frank Herbert's Dune universe
 Outdated full form of navvy in UK parlance
 Aviva Navigator, an integrated investment platform by Aviva

See also 
 List of people known as the Navigator
 Navigation (disambiguation)